This is a list of renamed or repositioned products.

Renamed products

Andersen Consulting became Accenture on January 1, 2001.
In France, Danones yogurt Bio changed to Activia on January 16, 2006 because of EU regulations on organic agriculture.
The original BankAmericard service and Chargex (in Canada) became Visa in the late 1970s.
Bib-Label Lithiated Lemon-Lime Soda changed its name to 7 Up Lithiated Lemon Soda and finally to 7-Up in 1936.
Borland changed its name to Inprise in 1998, and back again to Borland in 2001.
Boston Garden became Shawmut Center which became FleetCenter which became TD Banknorth Garden.TD Banknorth wins arena deal - The Boston Globe
Cellnet became BT Cellnet in 1999 which became O2 in 2001.
Cinnamon Grahams became Curiously Cinnamon.
Coco Pops (as it is known in the United Kingdom) took the name used in the rest of Europe, Choco Krispies in 1998, before changing back to the original brand of Coco Pops in 1999.
Charmin From February 2010, the product's European brand name was changed to Cushelle by manufacturer SCA.[4] There is also a new mascot, Koala which is a koala. In the advertisements for Cushelle, they are voiced-over by Robert Webb.
Coon cheese will be rebranded in 2020 by Saputo Inc due to pressure raised by the Black Lives Matter campaign
Darkie toothpaste was renamed Darlie in 1988.
Datsun became Nissan in 1983
Deloitte Consulting became Braxton in 2002 before changing back to the original brand of Deloitte Consulting in 2003.
DuPont Fabros Technology became DAC on 2 July 2015. 
Dime Bar, a confectionery product from Kraft Foods was rebranded Daim bar in the United Kingdom in September 2005 to bring the product in line with the rest of Europe.
Electrasol dishwashing products (as they were known in North America) became Finish in 2009.
Federal Express became FedEx in 1994.
Emap was rebranded as Top Right in 2012, then to Ascential in 2015
Freeserve changed to Wanadoo and then to Orange in 2006
GM Daewoo became Chevrolet in Africa, Australasia and Europe in 2008
GoldStar became LG Electronics on February 28, 1995 after merging with Lucky Chemical - LG is an initialism of Lucky Goldstar.
Hibernian Insurance became part of the Aviva. (this was actually Norwich Union, not Hiberian Insurance)
Immac (as it was known in the United Kingdom) became Veet in 2003.
The Interbank credit card became Master Charge in 1969, which became MasterCard in 1979.
Jif cleaning products (as it was known in the United Kingdom) became Cif in 2000.
Lilt became 'Fanta Pineapple & Grapefruit' in 2023
Mr Dog became Cesar, In 1989 the dog food brand was renamed.
Marathon (as it was known in the United Kingdom) became Snickers in 1991.
Several MSN products from Microsoft became Windows Live products.
Nestlé Quik (as it was known in the United States) took the European name Nesquik.
Nisseki and Mitsubishi Oil products and gas stations became Eneos in 2002.
NOW Legal Defense and Education Fund became Legal Momentum in 2004.
Oil of Ulay (as it was known in the United Kingdom) became Olay in 1999.
Opal Fruits (as it was known in the United Kingdom) became Starburst in 1998.
Ondigital became ITV Digital in 2001.
PricewaterhouseCoopers' Consulting division became Monday in 2002 before being sold to IBM. 
ProPortal a software product from Compass Computer Consultants Ltd became ProMonitor Learner Pages for Students in 2010 and was then renamed back to ProPortal on 4 July 2013
Purple Pill anti-heartburn medication was Prilosec (omeprazole magnesium)) until 2001, when the patent ran out and the Purple Pill name was switched to Nexium (esomeprazole magnesium).
Raider as it was known in most of Europe became Twix in 1991. Sales immediately plummeted.
Royal Mail renamed itself Consignia in 2001. The name change was unpopular with both the public and employees, and the company was renamed Royal Mail Group plc the following year.
Telecom Éireann became eircom'' in 1999.
US West, one of the original 7 Regional Bell Operating Companies, was acquired by Qwest in 2000.

References

Renamed
 
Renamed Products